Techfest is the annual science and technology festival of Indian Institute of Technology Bombay, consisting of social initiatives and outreach programs throughout the year.

Started in 1998 with the aim of providing a platform for the Indian student community to develop and showcase their technical prowess, with a footfall of 1.75 lakhs in its latest edition.  The activities culminate in a large three-day event in the campus of IIT Bombay which attracts people from all over the world, including students, academia, corporates and the general public.

History and growth 

The very first edition of Techfest was in 1998. It set the broad outlines of Techfest in the form of competitions, lectures, workshops, and exhibitions which went on to become a standard feature at every Techfest. Entrepreneurship also made an appearance in the 1999 and 2000 editions. Technoholix—Techfest in the Dark, showcasing technological entertainment at the end of each day as well as the hub of on the spot activities, made their debut during these years.

Techfest 2001-2002 saw the incorporation of IIT Bombay's department oriented events like Yantriki, Chemsplash and Last Straw. Students from G H Raisoni College of Engineering got the Engineering Excellence Award for best design. Mr. Amit Shankar Choudhary, Mr. Fahad Azad, Mr. Bodhisatta Ganguly was in the team of designers from GHRCE, Nagpur.

Techfest 2002-2003 launched the Techfest trophy to make the competitions more interesting. Colleges from all over India participated in multiple segments to win the trophy.

Techfest 2003-2004 marked a big milestone in the growth of Techfest as this was the year Techfest became an International event with the introduction of International Machine design contest - Cliffhanger. It also saw the introduction of the renowned robotics competition, Micromouse for the first time in India. Teams from Nepal, Sri Lanka and Singapore also participated in Cliffhanger.

Techfest 2004-2005 added challenging problem statements in the form of competitions like Survivor as well as Drishti, which was conceived with the National Association for the Blind (NAB) in order to provide aids for the visually challenged.

The emphasis at Techfest 2006 was on technology and its applications rather than just engineering know-how. With this view, a section of competitions held under the name E-Rustique had problem statements that encouraged the participants to come up with solutions to existing rural problems and hence contribute to the development of modern India.

Techfest 2006-2007 introduced an event Nexus to take robotics to the masses via robotics workshops and subsequent competitions with easy problem statements in many cities other than Mumbai.

In Techfest 2007-2008, Nexus was conducted at 7 centers across India namely Indore, Calicut, Jaipur, New Delhi, Pune, Surat and Mumbai respectively. Techfest 2008 also returned to the trend of taking up of initiatives by the Techfest team for social and public causes through their campaign on Global Warming.

Techfest 2008-2009 featured the iNexus  taking Nexus international to Sri Lanka, UAE and Denmark, whose finalists were flown to India to compete with their counterparts from India, making Techfest the first ever student organization to go truly international. It also saw the creation of open innovation platform called Prayaas  to try come up with implementable solutions to problems existing in rural India.
 
Techfest 2009-2010 added a new segment to their festival called Scintillations. The segment consisted of night exhibitions and thrilling interactive shows. The exhibitions had quite a nationalistic flavor with hangar space devoted to ISRO, Indian Navy and National Disaster Management Authority .

Techfest 2010-2011 added more entertainment events to the festival with a new section called Crossroads which featured Street Magic Shows, Stunt Shows etc. Some of the featured events at 2011 were the VirtuSphere and Laser Tag, lecture by the likes of Harold Kroto and Richard Stallman, exhibition of Science and inventions of Leonardo da Vinci and PR2, energy-saving competition among all Indian Institutes of Technology . Technoholix saw world's best Double Dutch (jump rope) crew.

Techfest 2011-2012 took a unique initiative Ummeed-e-Milaap  to step towards a peaceful future between India and Pakistan. WAVE-India was launched with the motto of spreading awareness about electric vehicles through a road-trip covering over 2500 kilometers through India. Great lecturers viz. Venki Ramakrishnan  (Nobel Laureate in Chemistry), Karlheinz Brandenburg  (Co-Inventor of MP3) and many amazing exhibits like Nao Robot (France), Crazy file (Sweden) etc. were a part of the festival.

Techfest 2012-2013 created a benchmark for itself with its lecture series, competitions and initiatives. This stint of Lecture Series at Techfest was graced by Amartya Sen, Ei-ichi Negishi (Nobel Laureate in Chemistry), Rakesh Sharma and many more. International Robotics Challenge(IRC), the flagship event of Techfest 2013, witnessed participation from 8 countries.  A new competition TechOlympics  was launched which saw 240 teams from India participate to solve multiple problem statements and compete to be crowned the winner. The initiatives - Techfest Green Campus Challenge (participation from 750 colleges and formation of 150 new Eco-clubs) and Give-A-Coin aimed at awareness of financial child adoption were a huge success and well appreciated all over the country.

Techfest 2013-2014 registered a participation of 1.35 lakhs which turned out to be the highest till that year. The lecture series witnessed Prof. C.N.R. Rao (Bharat Ratna 2014), Pranav Mistry (Inventor of SixthSense Technology), Kiran Bedi and many renowned personalities. The technoholix segment witnessed the World Premiere of a 3D projection mapping play, June, covered in Indian as well as Italian media. An anti-smoking campaign, I SMOKE  featured in Limca Book of Records for the most number of doodles collected. The 16th edition also saw the launch of 4G services for the first time in India by Reliance Jio.

Techfest 2014-2015 recorded a footfall of 1.45 lakhs. The edition featured a stellar lineup of eminent lecturers like late APJ Abdul Kalam, inventor of C++, Bjarne Stroustrup and one of the founding fathers of internet Vint Cerf. The social initiatives Techfest had undertaken over the past years were nominated for Times of India Social Impact Award. Smart City Challenge, inspired by Prime Minister Narendra Modi's vision of 100 smart cities in India, engaged college students to think of innovative ideas for making a smart city. ASK, the nationwide campaign of Techfest, with the partnership of NCPRI, was aimed at creating awareness of the Right to Information Act.

Techfest 2015-2016 witnessed the highest ever footfall of 1.65 lakhs. The lecture series featured Prof. Serge Haroche (Physics Nobel Laureate), Eric Klinker (CEO of BitTorrent) and Dr. K. Radhakrishnan (Former Chairman of ISRO). This edition included an International Summit to unite a dynamic community of global leaders and activists to discuss solutions for challenges and analyze the impact of technology. ReCycle, a college campaign of Techfest, aimed at creating awareness about physical fitness and environmental protection among the youth in society. Internet for All, a social initiative, with the association of NIELIT, aimed at improving digital literacy in India by teaching the basics of the Internet to school students.

Techfest 2016-2017 was based on the theme "A Space Expedition". The lecture series was graced by Rakesh Sharma (1st Indian in Space), Bruce Allen (American Physicist and Principal Investigator, LIGO Project), Mark Papermaster (Former CTO, Apple Inc.) and many more eminent personalities. This edition hosted World MUN with 525 delegates from all over the world. CURED?, a social initiative to make the masses aware of the causes and effects of Diabetes for which over 200+ camps were set up all across India. Save The Souls was an initiative aimed at stopping the inhumane testing of Beagle dogs in laboratories for which an online petition campaign was run. IAmPower was initiated with an aim to empower girls to become leaders of technology, innovators in STEM and build their own future through exposure to computer science and technology.

Techfest 2017-18 was based on "Digitalization, Sustainability and Biotechnology", and recorded a participation of 1.75 lakhs which has been the highest for any college festival. Sophia, the first ever humanoid robot to get citizenship made its appearance for the first time in India. The lecture series was adorned by Tanmay Bakshi (youngest IBM Watson Developer), Late Manohar Parrikar (Former Defence Minister of India), Jayanth Sinha (Former Minister of State, Civil Aviation) and many more distinguished personalities. International Robowars saw participation from 5 countries and had a massive response from its audience for its grandeur. SHE (Sanitary Health Education), a social initiative focused on emancipating the taboo of menstruation in India by conducting hygiene management sessions and distributing 2 Lakh sanitary napkins. Nirbhaya was another initiative which stood for women empowerment by conducting workshops on self-defense in various cities across the nation to help them stand-up for themselves.

Techfest 2018-19 was based on the theme "A Timeless Lapse". This edition raised the benchmark with its lecture series, social initiatives and competitions. The 14th Dalai Lama (Nobel Laureate, Peace), Simon Taufel (Member of the ICC Elite Umpire Panel) and many more eminent personalities graced the lecture series. Techfest, in association with SoULS, IIT Bombay, under its Student Solar Ambassador Program (SSAP) conducted workshops across all states of India where over 1,25,000 students were trained to assemble their solar lamps and became Solar Ambassadors. Also, a Guinness World Record for the most number of LED lights lit simultaneously was created. SPEAK: Stand to express initiative was launched to spread the message of positive mental health and for this workshops were conducted in more than 50 colleges throughout India mentoring 5000+ students. International Full Throttle saw participation of World ranked teams from 3 countries and had a massive response from both audience and teams in terms of grandeur.

Techfest 2019-20 was based on the theme "Da Vincian Spectacle" which was inspired by the idea that art and science are really closer than we think. The legacy of moving the benchmark higher and higher was continued by bringing lecturers like RoboThespian and Einstein robot. With lecturers like Zaheer Khan, Vidya Balan, Narayan Murthy and Tshering Tobgay, the quality of learning and experience is not comparable to any other fest. Techfest 19-20 organised IUnderstand, a financial initiative for making students financially literate throughout India, and under the social initiative BOLT, Techfest campaigned to spread awareness on the dangers of osteoporosis in adults by setting up Bone Health check up by setting up 50+ camps across the country and conducting 10K+ free bone health check ups for free

Techfest 2020-21 was based on the theme "An Elysian Singularity", a future where continuous advancement has launched the world into an age of bold innovation with uncontrollable growth, almost leading to a technological singularity point. This edition was held completely online due to the COVID-19 pandemic. It featured lectures from prominent personalities like the 14th Dalai Lama, Malcolm Turnbull, Rana Daggubati and Andrew Ng. Virtual Industry Visits, aimed at giving viewers a first-hand experience of what happens inside leading industries, were also introduced this year. Techfest 2020-21 organized 10+ fully online mental health sessions with 90+ professional counselors from across the country as a part of its social initiative HOPE, one of the country's most extensive initiatives on Mental Health Awareness and Suicide Prevention. Techfest also launched a petition to update India’s archaic animal welfare laws under WeCare, with workshops being conducted in 70+ schools across India in association with 10 major NGOs to sensitize students to the plight of stray animals during the pandemic.

Techfest 2021-22 was based on the theme "The Multiversal Escapade," which means venturing through the multiverse where one is similar, and the other is dissimilar to us. This year was also the 25th edition and one of its kind, with Techfest conducting the three-day fest on a virtual platform. It was graced by eminent personalities like Kevin Rudd, Ehud Olmert, Scott Belsky, and Takaaki Kajita. Virtual Ed-Conclave was introduced this year, helping high school students choose their field of study. Techfest conducted 50+ online breast cancer awareness sessions associated with 10+ NGOs as part of the social initiative Nidaan. 50+ sessions promoting betterment for differently-abled people were conducted under the initiative Saksham. This year Techfest also organized 50+ myth-buster sessions spreading awareness about Eye Donation in India as part of the social initiative Drishti. Techfest 2021-22 also conducted Robowars and Auto-Expo as the first post-pandemic event.

Patronages, awards and recognitions

Techfest is among the very few student organizations to have received patronage from United Nations organisations. Among its various recognitions, prominent ones are listed below:
 UNESCO  for promotion of technical knowledge
 UNICEF  for the social causes taken up through Ideate competitions and other initiatives over the years
 Centre for environment education("CEE") and (SAYEN) for its approach and initiatives towards environment changes
 Techfest has also been nominated for the Times of India "Social Impact Award 2015" for its unique social campaigns in the field of child education, women empowerment, encouraging Indo-Pak relations and creating awareness
Techfest, IIT Bombay in association with SoULS, IIT Bombay created a Guinness World Record for the "most LED lights lit simultaneously" on 2 October 2018

Structure and organisation 

Techfest is an entirely student-organized body. The core committee has 24 members: two Overall Coordinators at the helm and 22 managers who overlook all the aspects and activities of Techfest. Each Manager has a portfolio assigned to them which can be broadly categorized into two sections - administration and events. The administrative portfolios primarily include tasks like accounts, infrastructure, marketing, hospitality, publicity and media along with helping with the events. The events portfolios include responsibility for each of the numerous happenings and initiatives taken by Techfest each year. A team of over 800 Coordinators and Organizers along with 2500+ College ambassadors works in sync with the managers to execute and implement the activities of the festival. Each manager has their own team of coordinators and organisers, who together take care of every little detail of the department and ensure that ideas of the team are executed smoothly.

Events

Competitions 

Competitions serve as the backbone of Techfest by fulfilling its motto of spreading Science and Technology. Techfest 2021 Competitions saw a total participation of over 35,000 from various parts of the globe. With participation from more than 20 countries, this segment has evolved to become a tremendous stage for international exchange. Young enthusiasts from all over the world come together at this magnificent platform to prove their mettle at the vanguard of technical competitions. Competitions of Techfest, IIT Bombay, covers various genres under this segment like Competitive Coding under International Coding Challenge and World Programming Championship, Aerospace under Drone Challenge and Boeing Aeromodelling Competition, Aquatics under Autonomous Underwater Vehicle Challenge (AUV), RC Nitro Buggy Car under International Full Throttle, Robotics under Robowars and International Robotics Challenge and International Micromouse Challenge, Gaming under E-sports, Structural Engineering under    Crane-o-Mania. In 2020-21, Techfest organized a plethora of online competitions for participants around the globe. These explored different genres like AI under RecogniSign and Email Classifier, Software Development under Smart UI and Site developer, and Application-based competitions like Design for Defence, Computational Agriculture and Corpcomp. Ideate competitions, namely Covideate, Ujjwal Bharat and Aerovaccine, which require participants to come up with innovative solutions to real-world problems, were also conducted in the online method.

Techfest also organizes competitions for school kids to encourage them to explore the field of science and technology. Techfest Olympiads were conducted in 2019-20, and competitions like Young Inventor and Innovation Challenge were conducted in 2020-21 which were aimed at promoting innovation and creativity in young minds. In the 25th edition of Techfest, 20+ brainstorming competitions were conducted in online mode, focused on solving real-world problems, like HyperOps, Automatathon, AL-VTOLA, and many more. Also, the Trademaster competition was conducted for Finance enthusiastic students.

The International Robotics Challenge (IRC)  is an international competition, which has participation from over 12 countries. The elimination rounds are held in the respective countries and the finals held at Techfest. Till date IRC has seen participation from France, Russia, Sweden, South Africa, Egypt, Bangladesh, Ethiopia, India, Nepal, Pakistan, Syria, Sri Lanka and Thailand. Techfest International Coding Challenge also saw participation from different countries. In addition to the list of other competitions, the zonal competitions at Techfest, named Technorion included six nationwide zonal centers as Jaipur, Kolkata, Bhopal, Mumbai, Bangalore and for the first time in Lucknow in 2019-20 competing in robotics and coding competitions namely Meshmerize, CoDecode, Cozmo Clench and Techfest Olympiads held specially for school students around the country.

Techfest International Model United Nations (MUN) was launched with the aim of spreading political awareness on International affairs. Earlier held under the name of Techfest International Model United Nations until 2014, this competition was relaunched in 2016 as Techfest World Model United Nations (TWMUN). Techfest World Model United Nations (TWMUN) witnesses over 500 delegates from international universities/schools of over 20 countries, coming together to simulate various committees of the United Nations with the prime objective to innovate solutions of various international agendas and build diplomatic relations. TWMUN 2019 saw 10 different committees like WHO, UNGA, UNSC and even a special crisis committee being organized with delegates having intense discussion for a total prize worth of over 3 lakh Indian rupees. In Techfest 2020-21, the first-ever completely online TWMUN was conducted. Special committees like the Non-proliferation committee and Treaty review conference were introduced. It featured 13 committees including UNCCW, DISEC, UNCND, etc, and witnessed participation from over 350 delegates.

Smart City Challenge was an initiative inspired by Prime Minister Narendra Modi’s vision to develop 100 new smart cities to engage the youth of the country in the development of their city and prosperity of its citizens. The competition was designed with the vision of bringing together technology, government and the student fraternity to make the cities more efficient, sustainable, liveable and to improve the quality of life of the rapidly urbanizing population. 1000 teams participated across India involving students from IITs, IIMs, IISER, NITs and BITS. The expert panel of over 50 mentors consists of IPS officers, IIT professors, corporate professionals, and eminent government officers. Besides the prize money of INR 5 lakhs for winners, the ideas were also forwarded to the Delhi Mumbai Industrial Corridor Project Corporation.

International Robowars 

Robowars is the grandest competition in the entire Techfest. It has been one of the biggest crowd-pullers in recent years, with an audience of 7000+ in the Techfest 2019. In the starting years, there were two weight categories, 120 lbs and 30 lbs. Throughout the years, Robowars has seen mass participation and a massive crowd watching this event. Eventually, the event became The International Robowars in Techfest 2017-18. In recent years, Robowars has been hosted by the renowned ring announcer, Faruq Tauheed in Techfest 2019 and by renowned Indian model, actor, voice artist, TV presenter, and anchor Ridhima Pathak in Techfest 2022. Techfest saw a participation of more than 450 participants, with Team UARRIOR (World No.1 Team at the time) also participating in the event. Also, a new weight category of 8 kg was introduced in 2019. Currently, Champions are Riobotz(Brazil) and BlankaBotz holds the record for winning The Robowars Title for the most number of times (3).

Technoholix 
Technoholix consists of techno-cultural nights held over 3 days. Technoholix hosts a plethora of events like EDM nights, Laser shows, UV light shows, pyrotechnics, Tron dances, Acrobatics and Virtual 3D holographic displays for an ecstatic audience of over 20,000. Started in 2000, Technoholix has witnessed several bedazzling performances over the years by artists from around the globe like DJ Marnik, Danny Avila, AFISHAL, Julius Nox, Sonakshi Sinha and Arjun Kapoor. The finale event of Technohlix, which was earlier organized in the Open Air Theatre, was moved to Gymkhana Grounds of IIT Bombay in 2018, to throw the largest laser show ever in India. Justifying its name, Technoholix promises to fill the veins of the audience with adrenaline and leave a look of awe on the faces of thousands.

Exhibitions 

Exhibitions provide an ideal platform to reduce the gap between the technology in today's world and the common man in India. Every year Exhibition has mesmerized people by presenting technological avant-garde in the world. It helps young minds to broaden their vision and to update their tech know-how. The exhibitions segment of Techfest started out in 2004 with Indian Navy Exhibitions feeling the need to motivate young Indian minds towards military research. It was re-initiated in 2006 with a plethora of exhibitions. Welcome To Mars was the first International Exhibition from Arizona State University and NASA . While 2007 witnessed a massive increase in the number of International Exhibits of which the most prominent were Mind Reading Machines and the life-size exhibits of Pterosaur, 2008 had the first interactive exhibit in Techfest, the Shadow Dexterous Hand. In 2009 an Amphibot capable of moving without any limbs or wheels, face detection software on a robot security platform, rudders and flight control mechanics from Airbus, and DRDO's mobile autonomous launcher BrahMos were the major attractions. Alice the first robot smaller than a ping-pong ball and eye-writer writing by eye movement was the focus of Techfest Exhibitions 2010.
Da Vinci Robotics Exhibitions conceptualised by Leonardo da Vinci, Open vibe- the brain–computer interface which shows brain activity, PR2 Robot, Eccerobot 2- an anthropomimetic robot acting as a human replica were the cynosure of all eyes in 2011. Techfest 2013  saw the NAO Robot  from France, exhibits from the MIT Media Lab like the EyeNetra, and the HIRO robot. Exhibitions at Techfest 2014 witnessed the BINA48, Fumanoids (Germany), Solowheel (United States), Cubli (Vertex balancing cube, EPFL Switzerland) and many other exhibits. Techfest 2015 featured innovative Sepios which mimics swimming through proper fins. Bionic Hand, an artificial bionic prosthesis using 3D printing technology. Some other exhibits at display were Beach Bot, Teegi, Tigers Mannheim, Thomas Li Vigni and many more. Jinn Bot (robot which express moods such as joy and anger),  Dutch Nao Team exhibits from BRAC University, ETH Zurich were among the highlights of Exhibitions in 2016. Following the Space Expedition theme, Exhibitions in Techfest 2016-17 showcased ISRO prototypes, Advanced Military Weaponry, Bebionic hand with Techconnect, an exclusive showcase of IIT Bombay research projects and Exhibits.

Techfest 2016 also witnessed Auto-show as a part of exhibitions showcasing BMW i8, BMW M4, Hayabusa, Ducati, Triumph Bikes and many more. Techfest 2017-18 provided unparalleled variety and gave an amazing experience by showcasing Team Puli (Hungary), KinoMo (UK), GBL robotics(United States), Mini Robot (Korea), Synergy Moon, Neurosky, Universal Robots, Nao (Softbank). Techfest 2018-19 had many riveting exhibits like Android U( Hiroshi Ishiguro Lab, Japan), Furhat Robotics(Sweden), NTU Singapore, B-Human ( six times RoboCup German Open winner and 1 time RoboCup European Open winner), Skelex( Netherlands ) among many more. Techfest 2019-20 had amazing exhibits like Arm-XR to minimize the disability of specially abled humans, RoboThespian, world's first actor performer robot, PDRL, India's first indigenous air taxi and many many more. The Auto-show, as a part of international exhibitions, also showcased various cars like Porche Boxster, BMW Motorsport M5, Mercedes Benz AMG C63 and various motorbikes like Benelli TNT600, Suzuki Hayabusa, Kawasaki Ninja ZX10R, Honda Goldwing and Triumph Tiger among others. Techfest 2020-21 featured NEXTAGE, the all-in-one Dual Arm Robot designed to coexist with people by Kawada Technologies from Japan; the Nadine Social Robot, who can engage in intelligent conversation, play instruments and alter her moods; and the Daedalus an exoskeleton developed by Gravity Industries that enables humans to fly. The Virgin Hyperloop company, which is working towards commercializing high-speed transportation via hyperloop systems, and AUTOLAB’s project AlphaGarden, which attempts to find out whether AI can learn something as complex as polyculture farming, were also amongst the major attractions. The online exhibitions saw a viewership of more than 60K.

Lectures 

The past speakers at Techfest include personalities like:

 The 14th Dalai Lama (Nobel Laureate, Peace)
 Late Dr. APJ Abdul Kalam (Former President of India and Founder of India's missile program)
 Kevin Rudd (Former Prime Minister of Australia)
Dasho Tshering Tobgay (Former Prime minister of Bhutan)
Ehmud Olmert (Former Prime Minister of Israel)
Malcolm Turnbull (29th Prime Minister of the Commonwealth of Australia)
Late Manohar Parrikar (Former Defence minister of India)
Vint Cerf (one of the fathers of Internet)
Rana Daggubati (Indian actor, producer, television personality and entrepreneur)
Sophia, Hanson Robotics, Citizen of the Kingdom of Saudi Arabia (Most advanced humanoid robot ever built)
Zaheer Khan (Indian Cricket Legend)
Einstein Robot(Albert HUBO)
Ai-Da Robot (United Kingdom)
Prof. Eric Maskin (Nobel Laureate in Economics)
Jayant Sinha (Minister of the state, Civil aviation)
Viral V. Acharya (Deputy Governor, RBI)
Andrew Ng (co-founder of Google Brain and Coursera, pioneer in online education)
Simon Taufel (Member of the ICC Elite Umpire Panel)
 Randy Schekman (Nobel Prize recipient in Physiology)
Dilip Chhabria (Founder of DC Design)
Jimmy Wales (Founder, Wikipedia)
Scott Belsky (Chief Product Officer, Adobe)
Mustafa Ghouse (Director, Delhi Capitals)
Akhil Rabindra (Indian Motorsports Racing Driver)
 Ada Yonath (Nobel Laureate, Chemistry)
 Michael Sandel (Political Philosopher, Harvard University)
Gaur Gopal Das (Motivational Speaker, ISKCON)
C.N.R. Rao (Bharat Ratna 2013-Highest Civilian Award of India)
 Bjarne Stroustrup (inventor of C++)
 Amartya Sen (Nobel Laureate, Economics)
David J. Griffiths (eminent American physicist, Howard Vollum Professor of Science at Reed College, 1978-2009)
 Pranav Mistry (Vice President of Research at Samsung, Inventor of SixthSense technology)
 John Nash (Nobel Laureate, Economics)
 Harold Kroto (Nobel Laureate, Chemistry)
 Ei-ichi Negishi (Nobel Laureate, Chemistry)
Robert E. Kahn (One of the fathers of internet)
 Manjul Bhargava (Fields Medal and Padma Bhushan awardee, Mathematician)
 Venkatraman Ramakrishnan (Nobel Laureate, Chemistry)
Stephen Wolfram (Developer of Mathematica )
 Ryan Germick (Google Doodle team leader)
 Jaap Haartsen (Inventor of Bluetooth)
Jaime Lagunez (Scientist and Human Rights activist has accepted this year's invitation)
 Dr. K. Radhakrishnan (Ex-Chairman, Indian Space Research Organisation)
 Eric Klinker (CEO, Bit Torrent)
 Robert Aumann (Nobel Laureate, Economics)
 Takaaki Kajita (Nobel Laureate, Physics)
 Serge Haroche (Nobel Laureate, Physics)
 Rakesh Sharma (1st Indian in Space)
 Sharmila Tagore (UNICEF Goodwill Ambassador)
 Peter Atkins (British Chemist and renowned Author)
 Bruce Allen (American Physicist and Director, Max Planck Institute for Gravitational Physics)
 Mark Papermaster (Former CTO, Apple Inc.)

Virtual Industry Visits 
Techfest 2020-21 introduced a new event series known as the Virtual Industry Visits to engage the audience by giving them a virtual tour of India’s industrial megacentres through online platforms. More than 3500 participants got to experience a tour of the cutting edge manufacturing facilities and witness the ultra modern instruments and equipment at the factories as expert professionals meticulously guided them step by step through each process. Students and professionals alike participated in thousands to gain knowledge about the processes carried out in complex plants from Industry experts themselves. The Virtual Industry Visits were facilitated by reputed companies like Mercedes Benz, Larsen and Toubro, Dabur, Reliance, Bosch, Godrej, Nestle, Johnson & Johnson, ArcelorMittal, UltraTech Cement, Tata Projects, Indigrid, thyssenkrupp Industrial Solutions (India) and Thermax. 

Apart from the Industry Visits, Virtual Museum Visits to the Van Gogh Museum, which houses the largest collection of Van Gogh's paintings and drawings in the entire world and the Museum of natural sciences, USA, which has over 1.2 million visitors annually were also organised.

Social Initiatives 
Techfest has had a rich history in the space of initiatives for social & public causes. Several of the competitions each year have science problem statements intertwined with environmental sustainability, rural development, green energy & more. However, a clear distinction to these initiatives from other activities of the 25 year old fest was brought about in the 2007-2008 edition through their campaign on Global Warming. Each edition since then has covered things ranging from high output initiatives on women empowerment, free health checkups, osteoporosis to awareness raising initiatives on anti-smoking, financial literacy, RTI, Diabetes, physical fitness, mental health & many more. Two of the highest impact social initiatives by Techfest so far have been-

 SSAP - Student Solar Ambassador Program conducted workshops across all states of India where over 1,25,000 students were trained to assemble their solar lamps and became Solar Ambassadors. This initiative also holds the Guinness World Record for the most number of LED lights lit simultaneously.
 SHE - Sanitary Health Education was a social initiative focused on emancipating the taboo of menstruation in India by conducting hygiene management sessions and distributing 200,000+ sanitary napkins in 25+ villages.
The 25th edition of Techfest witnessed social initiatives like Drishti, Saksham, and Nidaan. Which had 50 myth-buster sessions spreading awareness about eye donation to 1,00,000 people & got 500 pledges signed in a single day under the initiative Drishti. Also, the initiative Saksham promoted the betterment of differently-abled people through 50 awareness sessions reaching 43,000 people and associating with 15 prominent NGOs under it. Moreover, the initiative Nidaan to spread awareness about the treatment of breast cancer by conducting 50 sessions and reaching 13,000 people in association with 10 NGOs

Ozone 
Ozone or ‘On the Spot Zone’ reveals the fun part of Techfest. It is the place to hang around for all the festive excitement and adrenaline gushing events. Started in 2006, it has proved to be an integral part of Techfest in the past few years. Through Ozone, Techfest has brought in various entertainment-based technical gadgetry for the first time in India, be it Lazer tag (2010), VirtuSphere (2011), Silent Disco (2013), F1 Simulator (2014) or Oculus Rift (2015), Augmented Wall (2017, China), Beat Saber (2018) 9-D simulator, most powerful realism(2019). Events like Junkyard Wars, Paintball, Water Zorbing, 6D-XD Simulator, Flying Simulator, Go Karting, ATV rides and the Gaming Zone help keep the audience engrossed when they are not involved in the grueling competitions and workshops.

Summit 

Techfest has hosted International Summit on topics like Artificial Intelligence and Internet of Things, over the years. An International summit was held in Techfest for two days. It focused on understanding how the business will be affected by these technologies which are rapidly adopted all over the world and how professionals may benefit from it as major technology companies and startups are embracing these strategies. The Inaugural Summit brought together corporates, entrepreneurs and investors alike, under one roof, to explore technologies like AI or IoT from business point of view. Professionals from various IT/Software cells and techies of various organizations across all strata of industry were invited to the summit. It allowed one to hear from the stalwarts of the industry and get the real picture in India and the World.

Techfest previous editions of summit consisted of panel discussions, workshops and keynote by speakers like Mr. Bob Frankston, Mr.Jeff Demain, Dr. Aloknath De, Mr. Sundara Nagalingam, Mr. Ishwar Parulkar, Mr. Rishi Bhatnagar, Mrs.Vidya Mani, Mr.Kaustubh Nande, Mr. Rafiq Somani, Mr. Rajendra Pratap Gupta, Mr. Anil Mathur, Mr. Kartik Iyengar, Mr. Parvez Goiporia along with other distinguished scholars. Workshops ware conducted by Microsoft, Intel, Texas Instruments, giving hands-on approach on various applications of AI, IoT etc.

The AI Summit of Techfest 2018–19, held on 14 and 15 Dec 2018, included names like Vikram Vij, Sohan Maheshwar, Mohammed Saleem, Siddhi Trivedi, Rajesh Sharma, Kapil Garg, Jalaj Thanaki, Pushpak Bhattacharyya, Surya Durbha, Mudit Garg, Aseem Jakhar. The people discussed the relevance of Artificial Intelligence incorporates and day-to-day life. Hands-on workshops giving a complete experience of the capabilities of AI were also conducted.

The summit of 2019-2020  was held between 3 and 5 January, was attended by names like Atul Tripathy, Atul Jalan, Uptal Chakrab0rty, Rajesh Sharma, Chetan Murty, the summit discussed points like Smart Mobility, Artificial Intelligence in Industries and Smart Manufacturing.

Techfest’s International Media Summit of 2020-21 was India's leading conference of acclaimed journalists and senior executives from all across the world. At the International Media Summit, topics related to the fields of Journalism and Media were discussed, which are tied closely with technology and help develop a deeper understanding of this rapidly evolving domain. It featured stalwarts of the field like Paul Pringle, Ravish Kumar, Rajdeep Sardesai, Farah Stockman, and Michael Braga.

Techfest 2021-2022 includes the first edition of the Fintech Summit, which primarily focuses on India’s Fintech Revolution, the future of money management, and reviewing banking and financial services post Covid-19. The International Fintech Summit is the ideal meeting place for facilitating multi-stakeholder dialogue with power-packed networking opportunities among C-Level executives, leading industry experts, decision-makers, and policymakers from across the value chain to foster collaboration, discuss current challenges and business opportunities, develop market strategies, share knowledge and identify solutions aimed at shaping the future of Fintech. Many Fintech giants were featured like Viral V. Acharya, Abhishek Kothari, Yashish Dahiya, Ruchir Swarup, Ganesh Rengaswamy, Priya Sharma, Arun Kumar, Samy Karim, Rajeev Agrawal, Vaibhav Garg.

Workshops 
Workshops play an essential role in fulfilling Techfest, IIT Bombay's vision of bringing the students face to face with the latest technology that is storming the world. These workshops are organized under expert guidance from various fields and are known to attract a lot of students owing to their repute and quality content. Techfest 2017-18 organized workshops in Google Android, Gesture Robotics, Automobile Mechanics, Financial Fitness, Underwater Robotics, Ethical Hacking, Internet of Things, ArduinoBotix, Quadcopter, All In Cloud, 6th sense Robotics & a lot more. 

In the 25th edition of Techfest, there were workshops on Solarizer, Python Programming, Artificial Intelligence, Machine Learning, Data Analytics, Automobile, Android Development, Cybersecurity, Ethical Hacking, Web Development, Amazon Web Services, Nanotechnology, Sixth Sense Technology, Embedded Systems, Deep Learning. Over the past few years, workshops in Techfest, IIT Bombay, provide an enriching experience to participants & connected with the most effective and tangible reform movement in high education. Apart from the workshops, Techfest also organizes WinTech Project by Dr. Saurabh Kwatra.

Virtual Ed-Conclave 
Techfest 2021-22 kick-started a new pan India initiative, namely Virtual Ed-Conclave. This two-day conclave consisted of 16 keynote sessions followed by Q&A from renowned professors, Deans, and Head of Department from prominent IITs. This event aimed to make freshly JEE qualified students aware of the different departments IITs offer, helping them make an informed decision in choosing their technical stream. The first edition of Ed-Conclave concluded successfully with a reach of over 40,000 students nationwide. 

Speakers at the first edition of the Virtual Ed-Conclave include: 

 Prof. Chebrolu (Associate Professor of Computer Science and Engineering at IIT Bombay) 
 Prof. Rajesh Zele (Pofessor of Electrical Engineering at IIT Bombay.) 
 Prof. Arghya Deb (Associate Dean (Infrastructure), IIT Kharagpur and Professor of Civil Engineering) 
 Prof. Shantanu Roy (Dean Academics, IIT Delhi and Professor of Chemical Engineering) 
 Prof. Ravi Kumar NV (Head of the Department, Metallurgical & Materials Engineering at IIT Madras) 
 Prof. Amit Agrawal (Dean International Affairs, IIT Bombay and Institute chair Professor of Mechanical Engineering) 
 Prof. Ameeya K. Nayak (Associate Professor of Mathematics, IIT Roorkee) 
 Prof. VC Srivastava (Head of the Department, Chemical Engineering at IIT Roorkee) 
 Prof. SK Mathur (Associate Professor of Economics at IIT Kanpur) 
 Prof. Preeti Ranjan Panda (Professor of Computer Science and Engineering at IIT Delhi) 
 Prof. Deepankar Choudhary (Head of the Department, Civil Engineering at IIT Bombay | Organising Vice-Chairman, JEE-Advanced 2015 and Founding Member, JOSAA) 
 Prof. Sanjeeva Srivastava (Professor of Biosciences and Bioengineering at IIT Bombay) 
 Prof. Nagarajan R (Head of the Department, Chemical Engineering at IIT Madras) 
 Prof. Suhas Joshi (Dean Alumni and Corporate Relations, IIT Bombay and Rahul Bajaj Chair Professor of Mechanical Engineering) 
 Prof. Dipanwita Roy (Head of the Department, Computer Science and Engineering at IIT Kharagpur) 
 Prof. Surjya K Pal (Associate Dean (Alumni Affairs), IIT Kharagpur and Professor of Mechanical Engineering)

Associates and Partners 
Techfest receives extensive coverage in print, television, digital as well as online media. Techfest has had Hindustan Times, DNA, Times of India, Indian Express, Maharashtra Times, Navbharat Times, CNBC, Times Internet, Discovery Channel, Big RTL Thrill, India Today, Big CBS Prime, 93.5 RED FM and 92.7 BIG FM as its media partners. In the past, consulates and embassies of Italy, Netherlands, Israel, Germany, Australia, Austria, Hungary, South Korea, France, Spain, Canada and Indonesia have supported Techfest in its endeavours. In terms of industrial and corporate associations, Techfest receives sponsorship from a wide range of sectors such as Telecom, PSUs, Banking, Crypto, Fintech, FMCG, Automobile, Electronics. Techfest has associated with top firms such as Amazon Prime Video, Reliance Jio Infocomm Ltd, which had the national launch of its 4G Free Wifi in Techfest 2014, Google, Microsoft, Intel, Larsen & Toubro, GE, IBM, NTPC, PepsiCo, Nestlé, RuPay, WD and many more such sponsors. Organisations such as DAAD, Alliance Française, British Council, Goethe Institute, German Centre for Research and Innovation, Polish Institute, Swissnex and India-Sri Lanka Foundation have also partnered with Techfest for the promotion of Science and Technology, education and cultural exchange. Social initiatives of Techfest have received the support of esteemed NGOs such as CRY, Smile Foundation, Khushi Life Learning, Befrienders India, Pratham, Muktangan, Suicide Prevention India Foundation, Garbage Concern Welfare Society, Indian Cancer Society, Laadli, Akshara  and The Candle Project. With a diverse participation, Techfest is a very good place for engaging and interacting with the youth of the country.

References 

Technical festivals in India
Indian Institutes of Technology festivals
IIT Bombay
1998 establishments in Maharashtra
Festivals established in 1998